Porta Salaria was a gate in the Aurelian Walls of Rome, Italy. Constructed between 271 AD and 275 AD, it was finally demolished in 1921.

History
Porta Salaria was part of the Aurelian Walls built by emperor Aurelian in the 3rd century, including pre-existing constructions in order to hasten the works. Under it passed the Via Salaria nova, which joined the Via Salaria vetus (Old Via Salaria) outside the city. The gate had a single passage and was flanked by two semi-circular towers. The Horti Sallustiani were located in the city just inside the gate.

During the restoration by emperor Honorius in the early 5th century, the arch was strengthened in opus mixtum, and over it three large windows were opened.

The Goth king Alaric I entered Rome from this gate to begin the famous Sack of Rome. In 537, the area between Porta Salaria and Castro Pretorio was the location of the siege by the Goth king Witigis against the troops of Belisarius.

During the Middle Ages, unlike other gates of the city, Porta Salaria did not receive a Christian name.

On September 20, 1870, the part of the Aurelian Walls between Porta Salaria and Porta Pia witnessed the end of the Papal States (see Capture of Rome). The gate was damaged by the artillery fire of the Italian troops, and the following year it was demolished. In 1873, it was rebuilt under the design of the architect Virginio Vespignani.

However, in 1921, it was again decided to demolish the gate to open the area to road traffic. The area is now occupied by Piazza Fiume ("Fiume square").

Remains
The 1921 demolition uncovered several funerary monuments of the sepulchres that flanked the old Via Salaria and that had been re-used to erect the towers. A copy of the sepulchre of Quintus Sulpicius Maximus, an 11-year-old boy, is now visible in Piazza Fiume (the original is the Musei Capitolini).

On right of the walls near the square are remains of 1st-century BC tombs.

See also

List of ancient monuments in Rome

References

Salaria
Rome R. XVII Sallustiano
Demolished buildings and structures in Rome
Buildings and structures demolished in 1921
Buildings and structures demolished in 1873